Helge Jakobsen (31 August 1901 – 25 September 1996) was a Norwegian politician for the Liberal Party and later the Liberal People's Party. He was born in Tromsøysund.

He was elected to the Norwegian Parliament from Troms in 1961, and was re-elected on three occasions. During his fourth term, in December 1972, Jakobsen joined the Liberal People's Party which split from the Liberal Party over disagreements of Norway's proposed entry to the European Economic Community.

Jakobsen was a member of Tromsø city council in the periods 1936–1937, 1937–1940, 1945–1947 and 1947–1949.

References

1901 births
1996 deaths
Liberal Party (Norway) politicians
Liberal People's Party (Norway, 1972) politicians
Members of the Storting
20th-century Norwegian politicians